Last Chance (or Morse) is a populated place in northeast Okfuskee County, Oklahoma, United States.

The community is on State Highway 56 approximately 7.5 miles north-northeast of Okemah.

References

Unincorporated communities in Okfuskee County, Oklahoma
Unincorporated communities in Oklahoma